is a Japanese anime director. Some of his works include being an animator in the Akira film; shorts in Robot Carnival, Short Peace, and The Animatrix; and key animation in anime such as Kiki's Delivery Service, City Hunter, and Fist of the North Star. He is the co-founder of Studio 4°C. He has hosted the independent creative team 'phy' since 2009.

Biography
Born in Wakayama, Japan, he graduated from the Osaka Designers' college in 1979 and a couple of years later joined the studio Annapuru as an animator for the TV series Tomorrow's Joe. While working there, he saw some animation by Takashi Nakamura in Gold Lightan, an otherwise standard mecha TV series by a rival studio. He was impressed, and it inspired him to quit his job and become a freelance animator.

Morimoto often collaborated with Nakamura, most notably in Katsuhiro Otomo’s "The Order to Stop Construction" segment of the anthology film Neo-Tokyo. This opened many doors for him, from working as animation director on Otomo's landmark feature Akira and a chance to direct a short for the Robot Carnival anthology. Around this time he founded Studio 4°C with producer Eiko Tanaka and fellow animator Yoshiharu Sato.

Since then, Morimoto has focused almost exclusively on his directing work. His work became increasingly unusual with time. This is best represented by the concert scenes in Macross Plus and his short film Noiseman Sound Insect.

Aside from a small cult following, his films have been ignored outside Japan. This has begun to change in recent years, with his artwork being featured in Takashi Murakami's Superflat exhibitions worldwide, the Anime Proto Cut exhibition, and was invited by The Wachowskis to direct "Beyond", a segment of The Animatrix. He is currently working on Sachiko, his second feature-length film.

Filmography

Film
 Robot Carnival – "Franken's Gears" (1987)
 Akira (animator, 1988)
  (1991)
 Nine Love Stories – "Hero" (1991)
  (1995)
 Memories – "Magnetic Rose" (1995)
 Noiseman Sound Insect (1997)
 Eternal Family (1997)
 Dimension Loop (2001)
 The Animatrix – "Beyond" (2003)
 Digital Juice – "The Saloon in the Air" (2003)
 Mind Game (2004)
 Genius Party Beyond – "Dimension Bomb" (2008)
 Short Peace (2013) – opening sequence
 A Better Tomorrow (2013)（Director HIKARI） – LEXUS SHORT FILMS Animation’s Part
 25 Anniversary Magic: The Gathering Exhibition (2018) "φ（Phy)"

TV
 Italian game（2016） "Lupin the III" Opening Animation
 18if　（2016）– Episode#10 "α Dream Dimension"
 Rinishii!! Ekoda Chan (2019) – Episode　#12

Music video
 KEN ISHII – "EXTRA" (1996)
 The Bluetones – "4-Day Weekend" (1998)
 Glay –  (1999)
 Hikaru Utada – "You Make Me Want To Be A Man" (2005)
 Hikaru Utada – "Passion" (2005)

Video games

References

External links
  
 Kōji Morimoto at Anime News Network
 KojiMorimoto.net 
 Karisuma Animators: Koji Morimoto at Pelleas.net
 Koji Morimoto anime works at Media Arts Database 
 
 

1959 births
Living people
Anime directors
Japanese animators
Japanese animated film directors
Japanese music video directors
Japanese film directors
People from Wakayama Prefecture
Studio 4°C